The Invisible Girl (Spanish: La pampa) is a 2022 internationally co-produced thriller drama film directed by Dorian Fernández-Moris and written by Fernández-Moris & Rogger Vergara Adrianzén. Starring Fernando Bacilio. It is based on the true story of a woman located in the lower area of Belén (Iquitos, Loreto), who had managed to escape from her traffickers.

Synopsis 
Juan, a former public official, flees from justice and from the tragedy that marked him for life. Reina, a teenage girl, runs away from the sexual and moral abuses she has suffered since she was a kid in the sexual exploitation camps of La Pampa, a place controlled by gold mining mafias. Joined by destiny they will depart in search of Reina's family in a territory of the Peruvian Amazon without authority, ravaged by crime and greed.

Cast 
The actors participating in this film are:

 Fernando Bacilio as Pedro
 Luz Pinedo as Reina
 Mayella Lloclla as Sucy
 Pamela Lloclla as Isabel
 Oscar Carrillo as Don Lucho
 Alain Salinas
 Sylvia Majo
 Gonzalo Molina
 Antonieta Pari

Production

Script 
In 2017, Dorian Fernández-Moris received a story from a woman from Iquitos who managed to flee human trafficking in La pampa. After researching for a year and a half, they began writing the script.

Financing 
The film won the Audiovisual Direction, Phonography and New Media (DAFO) award granted by the Ministry of Culture of Peru, where it received a donation of $150,000 to start production.

Filming 
The film was filmed in Pucallpa, Ucayali where the real sets of La pampa had to be recreated.

Release 
The Invisible Girl initially premiered in August 2022 at the 27th Lima Film Festival as part of the Fiction Competition. Its commercial premiere is scheduled for March 16, 2023 in Peruvian theaters.

Awards

References

External links 

 

2022 films
2022 thriller drama films
2022 crime drama films
Peruvian thriller drama films
Peruvian crime drama films
Spanish thriller drama films
Spanish crime drama films
Chilean thriller drama films
2020s Spanish-language films
2020s Peruvian films
2020s Spanish films
2020s Chilean films
Films set in Peru
Films shot in Peru
Films about human trafficking